is a Japanese term referring to residents of Korea (North and South) and Taiwan in the aftermath of World War II. The original term literally means "third country's citizen".

Concept 
In the immediate aftermath of the war, the legal status of Korean and Taiwanese nationals in Japan was not clear. The occupying American force enjoyed immunity from the Japanese legal system. Some Korean and Taiwanese people in Japan insisted that, since they were from liberated countries, they were no longer under the jurisdiction of the Japanese Imperial government. This resulted in many underprivileged Taiwanese and Korean people previously living under colonial rule forming criminal gangs such as the Yamiichi (闇市), a black market which was against the rationing system which continued after the war. The occasional clashes of these gangs and Japanese police were widely reported by the newspapers at the time. One such incident was the Shibuya incident. Many of these rioters were referred to by the term "Sangokujin", which was invented by the American administration. Soon, many Japanese began to associate the term Sangokujin with the criminal behavior of ex-colonial residents.

As the country became more stable, the term became something of an anachronism and was mostly forgotten. However, the use of the term was revived when the nationalist Tokyo Metropolitan Governor Shintaro Ishihara used it in an April 9, 2000 address to the Japanese Self Defense Forces (JSDF). In the speech, Ishihara suggested that the JSDF would be needed to suppress Sangokujin criminal activity in the event of a catastrophic disaster in Tokyo. 

I referred to the "many sangokujin who entered Japan illegally." I thought some people would not know that word so I paraphrased it and used gaikokujin, or foreigners. But it was a newspaper holiday so the news agencies consciously picked up the sangokujin part, causing the problem.

... After World War II, when Japan lost, the Chinese of Taiwanese origin and people from the Korean Peninsula persecuted, robbed and sometimes beat up Japanese. It's at that time the word was used, so it was not derogatory. Rather we were afraid of them.

... There's no need for an apology. I was surprised that there was a big reaction to my speech. In order not to cause any misunderstanding, I decided I will no longer use that word. It is regrettable that the word was interpreted in the way it was.

The governor later stated, "What is wrong with calling Sangokujins 'Sangokujins'?" Ishihara insisted that the term is a neutral reference to the Zainichi population for his generation. This has provoked much discussion about the political correctness of the term and whether or not colonialism of Korea and Taiwan is by itself an act of robbery of resources and native cultures.

See also
List of territories occupied by Imperial Japan
Chinese in Japan
Zainichi Korean
Discrimination
Ethnic issues in Japan
Gaikokujin
Japanese nationalism
Untermensch

References

Shintaro Ishihara
Ethnic and religious slurs
Racism in Japan
Japanese imperialism and colonialism
Anti-Chinese sentiment
Anti-Korean sentiment in Japan